A snipe in the motion picture exhibition business refers to a few things:

 Any material before the feature presentation other than a trailer.  "Welcome to our theater," courtesy trailers ("no smoking, littering, talking"), promotions for the snackbar, and "daters", that announce the date for an upcoming show, are the most common kinds of snipes.
 A printed sticker or material that is made for the purpose of being pasted over other print material, such as posters or souvenir programs, in order to alter or add to information.
 In a rare type, sometimes snipes do local events, places or merchants while music tracks play during intermissions.

See also 
 Snipe (graphic), or Promo
 Let's All Go to the Lobby

References 

Film and video terminology
Advertising
Audiovisual ephemera